Malaysian Netball Association is the national body which oversees, promotes and manages netball in Malaysia.  Established in 1978, the Malaysian Netball Association hosted the first Asian Netball Championship in 1985, and the 3rd Asian Youth Netball Championship.

Notes

References

External links
 

Netball in Malaysia
Netball governing bodies in Asia
Netball
Sports organizations established in 1978
Mal